Halberstädter Flugzeugwerke or Halberstadt was a German aircraft manufacturer. It was formed on 9 April 1912 under the name Deutsche Bristol Werke Flugzeug-Gesellschaft mbH in Halberstadt, Province of Saxony.

History

The British-German joint venture initially produced planes according to the system by the British and Colonial Aeroplane Company, Ltd such as Bristol Boxkites and Bristol Prier monoplanes, but soon expanded into their own developments. In September 1913 the company was renamed Halberstädter Flugzeugwerke GmbH. The chief designers were Hans Burkhardt, who later transferred to Gothaer Waggonfabrik, and the technical director and chief engineer was Karl Theiss.

The company built more than 1,700 reconnaissance aircraft (C type) and 85 fighter planes (D type), which served in the Luftstreitkräfte (German Air Force) during World War I. When German aircraft production was prohibited according to the 1919 Treaty of Versailles, the company, renamed Berlin-Halberstädter Industriewerke AG resorted to the production of agricultural machines and the repair of Reichsbahn railroad cars. Insolvency proceedings were opened in 1926; the Halberstadt factory premises were used by Junkers from 1935.

Aircraft
Besides license-built two-seat observation/flight school aircraft (Halberstadt A.II), Halberstadt produced scout-planes, ground attack aircraft, and fighters:

Halberstadt B types
B type planes were dual-seated unarmed reconnaissance aircraft built in 1914/15. The biplanes were equipped with Oberursel-Gnome rotary engines, later (B.II and B.III) with Mercedes six-cylinder straight engines. 
 Halberstadt B.I
 Halberstadt B.II
 Halberstadt B.III

Halberstadt C types

Reconnaissance aircraft
First flight C.I in May 1916, C.III end of 1916:
 Halberstadt C.I
 Halberstadt C.III
 Halberstadt C.V
 Halberstadt C.VII
 Halberstadt C.VIII
 Halberstadt C.IX

Ground attack aircraft
First flight CL.II around February 1917, CL.IV early 1918:
 Halberstadt CL.II
 Halberstadt CL.IV
 Halberstadt CLS.I

Halberstadt D types
Fighter planes
First flight D.I in February 1916, D.II end of 1916, and D.V beginning of 1917:
 Halberstadt D.I
 Halberstadt D.II
 Halberstadt D.III
 Halberstadt D.IV
 Halberstadt D.V

Large aircraft
A prototype medium bomber 
 Halberstadt G.I

Other

References
 Kroschel, Günter; Stützer, Helmut: The German military aircraft 1910–18, Wilhelmshaven 1977

Defunct aircraft manufacturers of Germany